The Belarus national under-23 football team (also known as Belarus Olympic, Belarus U-23) represented Belarus in international football competitions in Olympic Games. The selection is limited to players under the age of 23 however the Olympics allows for the addition of up to three overage players. The team is controlled by the Football Federation of Belarus (BFF). Belarus made its first appearance in football at the 2012 Olympics in London.

History

2004 Malta Tournament
The Belarusian Olympic team was assembled for the very first time at the 2004 Malta International Football Tournament and was composed of the members of the Belarus U-21 team.

2012 Toulon Tournament
Belarus was invited to participate in 2012 Toulon Tournament along with a four other under-23 teams preparing for upcoming 2012 Olympic Tournament (Egypt, Morocco, Mexico and Japan), two European under-21 teams (Turkey, Netherlands) and under-20 team of the host nation France. Belarus failed to advance to the knockout round and was eliminated after three games of tournament's group stage.

2012 Summer Olympics
Belarus made its debut at the 2012 Olympic Football Tournament in London after securing third place at the 2011 UEFA European Under-21 Football Championship.

Competitive Record

Olympic Games

*Denotes draws including knockout matches decided on penalty kicks.

Fixtures and results
2012 Olympic tournament

2012 Olympic tournament

2012 Olympic tournament

2012 Olympic squad
The following players were named for 18-man squad for 2012 Summer Olympics.

Caps and goals correct as of 1 August 2012, after the game with Egypt.

|-----
! colspan="9" bgcolor="B0D3FB" align="left" |
|----- bgcolor="#DFEDFD"

|-----
! colspan="9" bgcolor="B0D3FB" align="left" |
|----- bgcolor="#DFEDFD"

|-----
! colspan="9" bgcolor="B0D3FB" align="left" |
|----- bgcolor="#DFEDFD"

** Maksim Skavysh, originally a reserve player, has replaced Maksim Vitus, who sustained an injury in pre-tournament friendly and withdrew from the squad.

Reserves
The following players have been named as possible replacements in case any player from the main squad is injured.

See also
 Belarus national football team
 Belarus national under-21 football team
 Belarus national under-19 football team
 Belarus national under-17 football team

External links
 Belarus Federation of Football 
 Football.by

References

European national under-23 association football teams
Under-23